The Woolman Semester was a semester school focused on the intersections of peace, social justice, and sustainability. The school operated from the Spring of 2004 through the Spring of 2016.

Students came from all over the country to attend Woolman for a single semester during their high school junior, senior, or gap year. Students spent a semester deeply immersed in contemporary topics and exploring issues first hand . Students worked with each other, staff and interns to run the daily operations of the school, including cooking meals, chopping firewood, and growing and harvesting the food eaten at the school.

The classes of the program were Global Thinking, Peace Studies, Environmental Science, Non-violent Communication, Ceramics, and Farm to Table. Woolman is the only Quaker (Friends) semester school in the country, and in accordance with the philosophy of Quaker Education the Woolman Semester curriculum centers around collaboration, activism, and open inquiry into local and global issues.

General information
The campus is nestled in the Sierra foothills on 236 acres of field and forest. The nearest towns are Grass Valley and Nevada City, California.

The Woolman Semester began in spring of 2004, after a two-year restructuring period. Previously, the campus had been home to the John Woolman School, a four year high school that served the community from 1963 to 2001.

The mission of the school was to weave together peace, sustainability, and social action into an intensely rigorous academic experience.

Academics
Woolman Semester enriched a typical high school curriculum with college-level, seminar-style course work and experiential opportunities that promote lifelong learning, personal growth and intellectual commitment.

The core classes of the program: Environmental Science, Global Issues, and Peace Studies yield Environmental Science credit, Economics and Government credit, and English credit. Additional classes provide art credit and elective credits. Woolman is fully accredited by the Western Association of Schools and Colleges (WASC).

Students and staff spent much of the day in small, rigorous academic classes, with substantial time devoted to the hands-on work of the community: the garden and orchard, the kitchen, and the forest.
Teaching and learning is part of a collaborative community process that includes classroom work, independent projects, and off-campus trips.

See also
Conserve School
The Mountain School
Oxbow School

References

Semester schools
Private schools in California
Boarding schools in California
Quaker schools in California
Education in Nevada County, California
Buildings and structures in Nevada City, California
2004 establishments in California
Educational institutions established in 2004
2016 disestablishments in California
Educational institutions disestablished in 2016